Tanghalang Ateneo is the longest-running theater company of the Loyola Schools, Ateneo de Manila University. The company weaves into its work the theatrical traditions of the university's sesquicentennial past: the devotion of the salon de actos at the Escuela Municipal, the eloquence of the Ateneo Dramatics Guild, the joie de vivre of the Ateneo Players Theater, and the innovative spirit of the Ateneo Experimental Theater. Like these companies, Tanghalang Ateneo uses theater to foster eloquentia, sapientia, and humanitas – the pillars of Jesuit pedagogy. It sees itself as a theater company in the service of student formation, and by extension – given the Jesuit ideal of magis – a theater in service of the nation.

History 
Since its founding in 1972 (and formally recognized five years later), Tanghalang Ateneo has grown from a fledgling band of student players to one of the country's leading school-based theater companies. Its repertoire of plays is daunting: world classics, Filipino originals, and documentary texts turned into theater pieces. Its productions are noted for thought, generosity, and energy, while its lingua franca on stage are Filipino and English. Its members come from diverse academic fields. In fact, many have pursued careers in theater, television, and film; many more use their theater experience to excel in management, law, teaching, media, and cultural work.
 
Acclaimed professional actors have graced its shows, and several outstanding designers and choreographers have served as members of its artistic staff. To name a few, Naty Crame-Rogers, Irma Adlawan, Nonie Buencamino, Teroy Guzman, Bodjie Pascua, Frances Makil-Ignacio, Floy Quintos, Myra Beltran, Leeroy New, and Gino Gonzales have worked with the company in previous seasons. 
 
In addition, Tanghalang Ateneo has won two Aliw Awards for Best Production and another two for Best Direction for its 2008 and 2011 productions of Glenn Sevilla Mas's "The Death of Memory" (Direction: Ricardo G. Abad) and "Sintang Dalisay" (Direction: Ricardo G. Abad). Last year, the company received several citations, including two for the year's 10 Best Productions, in the Philippine Daily Inquirer's Best of Theater 2014 for its productions of Han Ong's "Middle Finger" (Direction: Ed Lacson, Jr.) and Glenn Sevilla Mas's "Rite of Passage: Sa Pagtubu kang Tahud" (Direction: Ron Capinding).
 
The company has also received production grants from the Cultural Center of the Philippines, the Loyola Schools, the National Commission for Culture and the Arts, the Spanish Program for Cultural Cooperation, and the Japan Foundation.
 
Furthermore, Tanghalang Ateneo continues to make itself known from the microenvironment of the Ateneo de Manila University, garnering nominations such as Project of the Year and Best Organization in the Council of the Organizations of the Ateneo de Manila University (COA) Awards. Its shows have also been shown in campuses and venues across the country and abroad, notably in Shanghai and Taiwan as part of the Festival of the Asian Pacific Bureau of Theatre Schools, and in Belarus, Minsk for the International University Theatre Association Student Theatre Festival. The company's past achievements have also facilitated the creation, in SY 2000–2001, of a degree program in Theater Arts within the Fine Arts Program of the Ateneo de Manila University.
 
Tanghalang Ateneo products educate and delight; they stimulate the imagination and provoke thought. Jesuit pedagogy fuses with theater arts to interrogate the Filipino social world so that students can invent themselves as critical Filipinos: sharp in thought, expressive in action, deep in faith and attuned to others – fellow players and audiences whose lives intersect with their own.
 
National Artist for Theater Design Salvador Bernal, Doreen Fernandez, and Nenita Escasa were among the company's advisers in the early years. Ricardo Saludo became the first artistic director and Moderator when Tanghalang Ateneo gained university recognition in 1979. Dr. Ricardo G. Abad succeeded him and became the company's longest-serving Artistic Director and Moderator (1984-2013). In 2014, Glenn Sevilla Mas came aboard and became the company's new artistic director and Moderator.

History
Tanghalang Ateneo descends from a long line of Ateneo theater companies, the Ateneo Dramatics Society and the Ateneo Experimental Theater, among others-which flourished in the college campus since its pre-war days at Padre Faura. It started out in 1974 as a group of friends who wished to stage plays, and having no theater to speak of on the Loyola Heights campus, scheduled performances at the college cafeteria. The group pressed the administration for a more suitable venue, and by 1978, a large classroom, seating about 80 people, was converted to a theater of sorts. In the old classroom, the group constructed wooden grids, light boxes, transformed a huge piece of canvass into a cyclorama, built an enclosed control booth, and draped windows with dark curtains, this is now called the Fine Arts Theatre. However, since 1989, Tanghalang Ateneo has been staging plays in a 250-seater theater called the Rizal Mini-Theater and recently, in other venues within the Loyola Schools such as the Fine Arts Blackbox Theater and the Doreen Fernandez Blackbox Theater.

The officers drafted a constitution, got recognized as a co-curricular organization in college, and recruited Ricardo Saludo, a faculty member of the Departments of English and of Communications, to serve as moderator. In 1979, under Saludo, Tanghalang Ateneo's first repertory season began. The repertory season of Filipino plays, original or in translation continued even after Saludo left to join Asiaweek magazine in Hong Kong in 1984.

He was succeeded by Dr. Ricardo G. Abad in 1984 who retained the repertory program but added English plays as part of its annual fare. In 2014, Glenn Sevilla Mas came aboard and became the company's new artistic director and Moderator. Tanghalang Ateneo productions have also been seen off campus: over the last decade, the company has performed in the Cultural Center of the Philippines, the Metropolitan Theater, the Puerto Real Gardens, the Ninoy Aquino Park, the British Council, the Alliance Francaise, Vigan, Iloilo, Nueva Ecija, and a lot more.

As a college theater company, Tanghalang Ateneo's primary mission is educational: It seeks to supplement the liberal arts program of the Ateneo de Manila University by exposing students to dramatic masterpieces, both classical and modern, and by instilling in company members the lessons of theater work-cooperation, responsibility, discipline, generosity and truth. One of the criteria in its selection of plays, as gleaned from the season's repertoire, is a preference for plays that will enjoin audiences to reflect more about their own private worlds and the relationship of these worlds to the larger society.

Seasons
First Season (1979–1980) 
Naibigan Mo Sana ang Sauna 
Ramona Reyes ng Forbes Park  
Second Season (1980–1981) 
Kilabot ng Makiling 
Isa Pang Bayani 
Taong Pang Habang Panahon
Ang Belen
Ang Sala  
Third Season (1981–1982) 
Ang Inspektor 
Eksena! 
Adriano VIII 
Ang Katubusan  
Fourth Season (1982–1983) 
Naibigan Mo Sana ang Sauna 
Sigwa! 
Kiko Kulang-Kulang
Banal at Baliw
Fifth Season (1983–1984) 
1+1=3/Two Act Plays 
Paraisong Parisukat 
Angel sa Impiyerno 
Kilabot ng Makiling  
Sixth Season (1984–1985) 
A Man for All Seasons 
Ang Kuripot 
Artenista: A Trilogy of Plays 
Ang Paglilitis ni Mang Serapio 
Orinola 
Ligawan 
The Good Woman of Setzuan  
Seventh Season (1985–1986) 
Beckett or The Honor of God 
Ang Inspektor 
Tatsulok 
The Ugly Duckling 
Angela
Usok, Ulap, Ibon, Kulisap  
Eighth Season (1986–1987) 
Pagsabog ng Liwanag 
Antigone 
Two Plays/Benefit Show 
Taong Grasa 
Orinola 
Tatlong Katuwaang Tig-iisang Yugto 
Ang Pamamanhikan 
The Boor 
Ang Anibersaryo  
Ninth Season (1987–1988) 
Paghihintay kay Godo 
The Importance of Being Earnest 
Tasulok II 
Gabun 
Alex Antiporda 
Ang Sopranong Kalbo  
Tenth Season (1988–1989) 
Felipe de las Calas  
Eleventh Season (1989–1990) 
Bb. Julie 
Sister Mary Ignatius Explains It All For You 
Doon Po sa Amin  
Twelfth Season (1990–1991) 
Pangarap sa Gabi ng Gitnang Tag-Araw
Immortal Diamond  
Thirteenth Season (1991–1992) 
Filibustero 
Pagkahaba-haba Man ng Prusisyon sa Simbahan Din ang Tuloy 
Murder in the Cathedral  
Fourteenth Season (1992–1993) 
Ang Trahedya ni Romeo at Julieta 
Tatsulok III
Cafe Apollo 
Mother's Day 
Balasa 
Paghihintay kay Godo  
Fifteenth Season (1993–1994) 
Antigone (in English and Filipino) 
The Importance of Being Earnest (Filipino)
Isang Bale Walang Komedya Tungkol sa mga Taong Seryoso
Hamlet, Prinsipe ng Dinamarka 
Sixteenth Season (1994–1995) 
Oedipus Rex 
The Glass Menagerie 
Cyrano de Bergarac  
Seventeenth Season (1995–1996) 
Isang Pangyayari sa Planas Site 
Tuwaang: Isang Epikong Manobo sa Pantomina 
Doon Po sa Amin 
2Bayani: Isang Bagong Rock Opera
Eighteenth Season (1996–1997) 
Dalawang Sulok
Lysistrata
2Bayani: Isang Bagong Rock Opera
Ang Apologia ni Sokrates 
Ang Mabuting Tao ng Setzuan 
Ang Kambal 
Freshman 
Mga Kahon 
Makbet  
Nineteenth Season (1997–1998) 
Tartuffe
Ang Mabuting Tao ng Setzuan 
Equus 
Therese ng Lisieux 
Kilabot ng Makiling
Ang Kambal 
Pangarap sa Gabi ng Gitnang Tag-Araw  
Courtship by Handkerchief and Fan
Twentieth Season (1998–1999)
Marisol 
Paghihintay kay Godo
TA Lab I 
Ang Punong Inspektor 
The Kahapon, Ngayon at Bukas Seditious Love Musical
TA Lab II  
Twenty-First Season (1999–2000)
The Kahapon, Ngayon at Bukas Seditious Love Musical
Ningning sa Silangan
The Merchant of Venice
TA Lab III
Artenista: An Ateneo Theater Festival
Twenty Second (2000–2001)
Twelfth Night: Kung Ano'ng Ibigin
The Mistress of the Inn
Santa Juana ng mga Kural
Twenty Third (2001–2002)
La Vida es Sueno (Ang Buhay ay Isang Panaginip)
Mirandolina: Ang Senyora ng Otel
When the Purple Settles
Ang Pagpapaamo sa Maldita
Twenty Fourth (2002–2003)
Ang Bagong Damit ng Dakilang Bahaghari
Isang Buhay sa Tambakan
Rhinoceros
Twenty Fifth (2003–2004)
Bawat-Tao
Ang Palilitis ni Mang Serapio
Don Juan: Ang Babaero ng Sevilla
An Enemy of the People
Twenty Sixth (2004–2005) The Fighting Season
An Enemy of the People
Re-Isyu: Santuario & Linya
Lam-ang
3PO
Twenty Seventh (2005–2006) The Season of Flight
Bayan-Bayanan: Pinoy sa Diaspora
Nasaan si Kaliwete
Ang Nilalang ni Victor Frankenstein
Twenty Eighth: (2006–2007) The Season of Awakening
Ang Buhay ay Isang Panaginip
Ang Aksidenteng Kamatayan ng Isang Anarkista
STArting 5: Iba 'to!
Middle Finger Po
The Glass Menagerie
Twenty Ninth: (2007–2008) The Season of Truth
Ang Litisang Bilog ng Caucasus
TABAKADA!: Tanghalang Ateneo Brings Alive Komedya And Drama Anew
The Death of Memory
Hakbang sa Hakbang
Thirtieth Season: (2008–2009) Echoes
May Day Eve
?: Two by Ionesco
Otelo: Ang Moro ng Venecia
TALAB: Tanghalang Ateneo. Live. Act. Beybeh!
Lysistrata
Thirty-First Season: (2009–2010) Bayanihan
Metamorphoses
Baha-Bahang Buhay: Mga Kuwentong Ondoy
Walang Sugat
Thirty-Second Season: (2010–2011) The Season of Ardent Pursuits
La Ronde
Walang Sugat
Ang Kambal
Confessiones: Pag-Amin at Papuri ni San Agustin
What You Will
Thirty-Third Season: (2011–2012) Undaunted
Sintang Dalisay
Para Los Jovenes: Mga Pangkabataang Kuwento ng Nakatatandang Rizal
Fireflies
Thirty-Fourth Season: (2012–2013) Journeys
Sintang Dalisay
4Play
The King of the Birds
Thirty-Fifth Season: (2013-2014) Re-Imagining the Greeks
Ang Oresteyas
Ang Bakkhai 
Euridice 
Breakaway Antigone
Thirty-Sixth Season: (2014-2015) Navigating Identities
Middle Finger
TA Lab: TAwid
Rite of Passage: Sa Pagtubu Kang Tahud
Paghihintay kay Godo
Thirty-Seventh Season: (2015-2016) Staging Revolution/s
R.U.R. (Robot Unibersal ni Rossum)
TA Lab: Utos ng Hari
Kalantiaw
Thirty-Eighth Season: (2016-2017) De/Constructing Narratives
Boy
Si Janus Silang at ang Tiyanak ng Tábon
TA Lab: Takas
Thirty-Ninth Season: (2017-2018) Performing Change
 Si Janus Silang at ang Labanang Manananggal-Mambabarang
 TA Lab: Tambalan
 Lysistrata ng Bakwit
 The Squaddies' Shrew
Fortieth Season: (2017-2018) Sturm und Drang/ Bagyo at Bagabag
 TA LAB: Squaddies' Shrew
 TA LAB: Gilgamesh
 Marisol
 AKO: Alpha Kappa Omega

Ateneo de Manila University
Theater companies in Metro Manila